Geoff Dunbar is an English animator and director known for his animated music video Rupert Bear and the Frog Song for Sir Paul McCartney and  The World of Peter Rabbit and Friends from the stories by Beatrix Potter. He championed a hand-sketch style of animation.

Career
He left school at 15 and joined Larkins Studio when he was 18/19. where he learnt animation. He later joined Halas and Batchelor's animation company where he started directing. In 1973 he joined Dragon Productions with Oscar Grillo, who with the Arts Council of Great Britain co-financed Lautrec. He later formed his own company, Grand Slamm Animation, where he produced Ubu. Lautrec won the Palme d'Or at the Cannes Film Festival in 1975 and Ubu won the Golden Bear award for Best Short Film at the 1979 Berlin International Film Festival.

Works
He went on to produce three animations with the soundtrack by Sir Paul McCartney. He produced three episodes for the BBC of The World of Peter Rabbit and Friends.

Using his 'sketched' style of animation he produced Daumier's Law based on the work of the 19th century French artist Honoré Daumier. It won a BAFTA in 1993 for best short animation.

In collaboration with Sir Paul McCartney he adapted the Caldecott Prize-winning children's novel Tuesday by David Wiesner using computer animation. The film received a BAFTA nomination in 2000.

His current company is High Eagle Productions.

In 2019 the Barbican Music Library held an exhibition of his work: Geoff Dunbar: Art into Animation.

Filmography

References

External links
 Official website
 Lautrec (1974) BFI National Archive
 Geoff Dunbar Ubu
 Daumier's Law Parts 1,2,3.
 Rupert And The Frog Song - We All Stand Together
 Heineken - Worm (1989, UK)
 Janáček: The Cunning Little Vixen (Opus Arte)

English animators
People from Abingdon-on-Thames
Living people
Year of birth missing (living people)